Lars Gunnestad (born 18 February 1971 in Drammen, Norway) is a former Norwegian international motorcycle speedway rider. He won the Individual Speedway Norwegian Championship a record ten times.

His son, Lars Daniel, is speedway rider also. Lars Daniel finished fifth in the 2009 Norwegian Championship.

Career summary 
Gunnestad first came to prominence in 1988 when he won his first Norwegian title at the age of 17. His first British club was Sheffield in 1991, who competed in the British League Division Two. Gunnestad missed the British speedway season in 1992, but returned in 1993 when he was signed by British League team the Poole Pirates with whom he would spend this rest of his British career. Gunnestad became a popular rider at Poole and eventually received a testimonial meeting there in 2001. He appeared in five Speedway Grand Prix meetings as a wild card.

Speedway Grand Prix results

World Longtrack Championship

 1994 Semi-final
 1995 Semi-final
 1996 -  Herxheim (18th) 3pts

See also 
 Norway national speedway team
 List of Speedway Grand Prix riders

References

External  links 
Lars Gunnestad profile at Speedway History Info

1971 births
Living people
Norwegian speedway riders
Polonia Bydgoszcz riders
Poole Pirates riders
Sheffield Tigers riders
Norwegian expatriate sportspeople in Poland
Individual Speedway Long Track World Championship riders
Sportspeople from Drammen